Pedro de Viscarra de la Barrera, twice Royal Governor of Chile, was an old lawyer who had arrived in the Captaincy General of Chile from Spain in 1590. Alonso de Sotomayor went to Peru on July 30, 1592 to petition the viceroy there for more men leaving Pedro de Viscarra with the title of lieutenant governor of Chile. Upon the arrival of Martín García Óñez de Loyola on 23 September 1592 to replace Sotomayor, Viscarra relinquished his office.

After Loyola was killed in the Battle of Curalaba in December 1598, Pedro de Viscarra again was the temporary governor of the Kingdom of Chile for six months until he was replaced as governor by Francisco de Quiñónez in May 1599.

16th-century births
Year of death unknown
People from Seville
Royal Governors of Chile
16th-century Spanish people
16th-century Chilean people
People of the Arauco War